Hewelsfield is a village in Hewelsfield and Brockweir civil parish, in the Forest of Dean district of Gloucestershire, England.

The village is located 6 miles south of Coleford and 5 miles north-east of Chepstow, close to the Wye valley and partly within an Area of Outstanding Natural Beauty.

History
The area was known in the Anglo-Saxon period as Hiwoldestone.  It was included by William the Conqueror in the Royal Forest of Dean, but by the 12th century was established as a village, with a church. Ancient routes running up from the River Severn at Alvington and Woolaston met at Hewelsfield village and continued to the nearby village of St. Briavels. In 1266 the manor of Hewelsfield was granted to Tintern Abbey, which retained it until the Dissolution in 1536.  Together with the abbey grange at Brockweir, the manor was then granted  to Henry Somerset, 2nd Earl of Worcester.

There is evidence of a small castle motte close to the church, and earthworks close to the castle suggest either a deserted medieval village or field boundaries.  A separate ancient field system exists close to Hewelsfield Court.

The village was designated a Conservation Area in 1990.

Church of St. Mary Magdalen
The parish church of St. Mary Magdalen has a Norman nave; an Early English chancel (restored in the 19th century); and a north transept enlarged in the 16th century. The churchyard is circular in form, which is often taken to suggest a pagan site or Celtic foundation.

Hewelsfield Common
The area known as Hewelsfield Common, west of the village and sloping down to the River Wye, was occupied and developed in a piecemeal fashion by squatters in the 18th and early 19th centuries. Later in the 19th century, encouraged partly by the opening of the Wye Valley Railway on the Monmouthshire side of the river in 1876, private residents and retired people settled in the area and enlarged the cottages or built new houses.

Village Community Shop
Hewelsfield, together with Brockweir, is served by the Brockweir and Hewelsfield Village Shop and Café, a non-profit making community enterprise, staffed by volunteers from the local community.

Listed buildings in Hewelsfield
Listed buildings in the village of Hewelsfield are listed in the tables below, with links to the relevant Historic England list entry.  Listed buildings in the village Brockweir are given in the Wikipedia article on Brockweir.  For the purposes of the tables, 'Hewelsfield' is taken to include all buildings in the Civil Parish of Hewelsfield and Brockweir to the east of Offa's Dyke; 'Brockweir' is taken to include all buildings in the Civil Parish of Hewelsfield and Brockweir to the west of Offa's Dyke.

References

External links

Photographs of Hewelsfield Parish Church
Hewelsfield and Brockweir Parish Council
Brockweir and Hewelsfield Village Shop and Café

Villages in Gloucestershire
Forest of Dean